Arianshahr ( - formerly Sedeh, also Romanized as Seh Deh and Sehdeh) is a city in and the capital of Sedeh District, in Qaen County, South Khorasan Province, Iran. At the 2006 census, its population was 3,051, in 834 families.

References 

Populated places in Qaen County

Cities in South Khorasan Province